Helen Wenda Small  (born 23 October 1964) is the Merton Professor of English Language and Literature at the University of Oxford and a fellow of Merton College, Oxford. She was previously a fellow of Pembroke College, Oxford.

Early life
Small was born on 23 October 1964 in Wellington, New Zealand. Her parents are Colin McEwen Small and Wenda Mary Lavinia Heald. She attended Queen Margaret College, Wellington. She received a bachelors of arts degree in English from the Victoria University of Wellington in 1985 and a bachelor of arts with honours degree the following year. She received a Ph.D. from St Catharine's College at the University of Cambridge in 1991 and was made an honorary fellow in 2018. Her partner is Tim Gardam and she has one daughter.

Career 
Small worked as a residential fellow at St Catharine's College between 1990 and 1993, before working as a lecutrer in English at the University of Bristol between 1993 and 1996. She was a lecturer at Pembroke College, Oxford, before becoming a professor and then a Jonathan and Julia Aisbitt Fellow in English Literature between 1996 and 2018. She was the recipient of a Leverhulme Research Fellowship from 2001 to 2004. She began working as a fellow of Merton College, Oxford, in 2018 and as the Merton Professor of English Language and Literature.

Published works
Love's Madness: Medicine, the Novel, and Female Insanity, 1800-1865 (Oxford University Press, 1996)
The Public Intellectual (editor; Blackwell, 2002)
Literature, Science, Psychoanalysis, 1830-1970: Essays in Honour of Gillian Beer (editor, with Trudi Tate; Oxford University Press, 2003)
The Long Life (Oxford University Press, 2007)
The Value of the Humanities (Oxford University Press, 2013)

Awards and recognition
2008: Rose Mary Crawshay Prize, The Long Life
2008: Truman Capote Award for Literary Criticism, The Long Life
2018: Elected Fellow of the British Academy

References

External links
Faculty and Staff Profiles: Helen Small

1964 births
Living people
People educated at Queen Margaret College, Wellington
Alumni of St Catharine's College, Cambridge
Fellows of Pembroke College, Oxford
Fellows of Merton College, Oxford
Merton Professors of English Language and Literature
Victoria University of Wellington alumni
Rose Mary Crawshay Prize winners
Fellows of the British Academy